Nirbhay Singh Patel was a leader of Bharatiya Janata Party from Madhya Pradesh. He was a member of Madhya Pradesh Legislative Assembly elected from Depalpur in 1980, 1990, 1993. He served as cabinet minister in Patwa ministry.

Sons = Manoj Patel, Ravi Patel.

References

Year of birth missing
Possibly living people
People from Indore district
State cabinet ministers of Madhya Pradesh
Madhya Pradesh MLAs 1980–1985
Madhya Pradesh MLAs 1990–1992
Madhya Pradesh MLAs 1993–1998
Bharatiya Janata Party politicians from Madhya Pradesh